This is a list of current and former state prisons and minimum security prison camps in Michigan. It does not include federal prisons or county jails located in that State. All facilities not otherwise indicated are facilities for men.

Michigan State Prison (also called the Jackson Prison) was the first state prison, built in 1842. A larger prison building was built in 1926 and used until 2007. It was reorganized into separate prisons in 1988. The Detroit House of Corrections, built in 1861, was owned and run by the city of Detroit but originally accepted prisoners from throughout the state including women. The Detroit House of Corrections was transferred to the state in 1986, renamed to Western Wayne Correctional Facility, and became a women's facility for the rest of its tenure. It eventually closed in December 2004 and all inmates and staff were transferred to the Huron Valley Complex in Ypsilanti. The closure of the facility saved the state an estimated $23 million per year. The Michigan Asylum for Insane Criminals was built in Ionia in 1885 and treated prisoners and non-prisoners until 1972. It was renamed the Ionia State Hospital and is currently Riverside Correctional Facility. The Marquette Branch Prison was built in 1889 for Upper Peninsula prisoners and the original building is still in use.

In operation
As of January 2014, these facilities are open and in operation.

Closed
As of January 2014, these facilities are currently closed, or have been consolidated into other facilities.

Prisons 

West Shoreline Correctional Facility closed on March 24, 2018

Minimum security prison camps 
The minimum security prison camp program was ended in 2009 with the closures of Camp Cusino, Camp Kitwen, Camp Lehman, Camp Ottawa, and Camp White Lake.

See also
 Michigan Department of Corrections
 W.J. Maxey Boys Training School, for delinquent male youths, 12 to 21 years of age

References

External links 
 Michigan Department of Corrections

 
Michigan
Prisons